The Master of Philosophy (MPhil; Latin  or ) is a postgraduate degree. An MPhil may be awarded to postgraduate students after completing taught coursework and one to two years of original research, which may also serve as a provisional enrolment for a PhD programme.

In the United States, an MPhil typically includes a taught portion and a significant research portion, during which a thesis project is conducted under supervision.

Australia
In Australia, the Master of Philosophy is a research degree which mirrors a Doctorate of Philosophy (PhD) in breadth of research and structure. Candidates are assessed on the basis of a thesis. A standard full-time degree often takes two years to complete.

Belgium and Netherlands

In Belgium and the Netherlands, the MPhil is a special research degree, and is only awarded by selected departments of a university (mostly in the fields of arts, social sciences, archaeology, philosophy and theology). Admission to these programmes is highly selective and primarily aimed at those students aiming for an academic career. After finishing these programmes, students normally pursue a PhD programme.

The Dutch Department of Education, Culture and Science decided in 2009 not to recognize the MPhil degree. Accordingly, Dutch universities stopped awarding this degree and now award the legally-recognized Master of Arts or Master of Science degrees instead.

Canada
The MPhil is offered at some Canadian universities as a two-year degree involving coursework, examinations, and practice at academic writing. At some institutions, successful completion leads to a guaranteed place on a PhD course with "advanced standing", reducing the length of the PhD by a year.

India
Indian universities offer MPhil degrees as the most advanced master's degree in the fields of arts, science and humanities. The duration is typically two years long and includes both a taught portion and an extensive research portion. Several universities offer enrollment in their integrated MPhil–PhD program and MPhil degree holders are usually exempted from some of the doctoral coursework requirement. In July 2020, the Government of India announced that, as part of its new National Education Policy, MPhils would be discontinued in India.

Finland

In Finland, the regular master's degree filosofian maisteri translates to "Master of Philosophy". As in English, the term "philosophy" does not imply a specialization in theoretical philosophy. These degrees are regular master's degrees, not special "higher" degrees (cf. Licentiate and Doctor of Philosophy). In the past, filosofian maisteri signified that the degree was earned through actual studying, in contrast to honorary master's degrees that were granted upon application to bachelor's degree graduates.

Malaysia

In Malaysia, the MPhil degree is commonly offered in a number of older and more-established universities in Malaysia, including the University of Malaya, Multimedia University (MMU), Wawasan Open University, University of Nottingham Malaysia Campus (UNMC), Monash University Sunway Campus (MUSC) and Curtin Malaysia Campus. In most cases, the MPhil is largely a research degree, with only a minor taught component. On a case-by-case basis, candidates must pass a viva voce examination before the degree is awarded. For UNMC and MUSC, the Faculty of Engineering offers a standalone MPhil degree which will lead to the PhD.

Specifically for the University of Malaya, if the desired field of research does not belong to any of the specialized faculties, it is normally categorized under the MPhil supervised by the Postgraduate Institute.

In November 2012, the Malaysian Qualifications Agency issued programme standards for postgraduate studies in which MPhil is attributed to Master programme by research and mixed mode (coursework and research).

Norway

In Norway, the degree of MPhil was a master's degree (180 ECTS credits) at a level equivalent to an MA or MSc However, unlike a standard MA or MSc, which have a thesis worth 60 ECTS, the MPhil has a research workload of up to 180 ECTS. Upon completion, the MPhil graduate usually qualifies for acceptance to a PhD program. Nevertheless, the MPhil is most often taken as a standalone qualification.

The MPhil degree was considered to be equivalent to US and UK PhD degrees and from the early 1900s the PhD established itself as the usual translation of Danish and Norwegian master's degrees into English. This must be seen in the context of the fact that the PhD originally designated research education in the US and eventually equivalent degrees in the UK which had a similar scope and fulfilled a similar function as the master's degree in Denmark and Norway, as the final degree taken at the beginning of a research career, while the doctorates in Denmark and Norway were often taken by middle-aged and well-established academics. In Denmark and Norway, PhD in the 20th century was therefore not necessarily or necessarily regarded as identical to a "doctorate" as understood in Denmark and Norway.

Pakistan
In Pakistan, the MPhil is one of the most advanced master's degrees offered by public and private universities in several different fields of study. This is usually a two-year full-time program which includes teaching and research that leads to the PhD. The degree of MPhil also served as a requirement to gain admission into a Doctoral program in Pakistan until early-2021.

Spain

In Spain, the MPhil degree is equivalent to the Diploma de Estudios Avanzados, or DEA. In order to obtain it, the student has to complete a full year of doctoral courses and training in research methods, as well as doing original research towards a thesis.

United Kingdom
In most UK universities, the MPhil is a research degree. The completion of an MPhil typically requires two years of full-time (or five years or more of part-time study) and the submission of coursework and a thesis comprising a body of original research undertaken by the candidate (typically 25,000 to 50,000 words). It is common for students admitted into a PhD program at a UK university to be initially registered for the degree of MPhil, and then to transfer (or upgrade) to the PhD upon successful completion of the first (or sometimes the second) year of study: this will often involve the submission of a report or dissertation by the student, and possibly an oral examination or presentation. Conversely, a PhD candidate may transfer to an MPhil programme or be awarded the degree of MPhil if they do not meet the requirements for the award of a PhD.

Usage can be different at the ancient universities. The MPhil at Oxford and Cambridge can be either a taught degree or a research degree, and may take one or two years, depending on the course. Cambridge University offers one- and two-year-long MPhil degree programs across all of its departments and faculties. This takes the place of the MA at other universities, as the Oxbridge MA is awarded to BA graduates  after a certain period without any further study. At Oxford University, the MPhil is usually a two-year master's degree, although some programs are one-year. The MPhil requires a lengthy thesis and more examinations than a one-year master's degree (such as the MSc or MSt). The ancient Scottish universities, who for historical reasons award the Scottish MA upon completion of four-year first degree programs in arts and humanities subjects, differ in their use of MPhil or MLitt for postgraduate research degrees, but are slowly standardizing to the MPhil as a research degree and the MLitt as a taught degree.

United States
Most American universities do not award the Master of Philosophy degree. A few institutions, such as Yale University, Columbia University, New York University, George Washington University, The New School, and the CUNY Graduate Center, award it under certain circumstances, such as to Ph.D. candidates when they complete their required coursework and qualifying examinations but have not yet completed and defended their doctoral dissertation. This formalizes the more colloquial "All But Dissertation" status; as such, defense of a dissertation proposal is sometimes required for conferral. Other colleges and universities, such as the University of Michigan and the University of Pennsylvania, offer a standalone MPhil as an advanced graduate degree in various fields.

See also
Bachelor of Philosophy
Candidate of Philosophy
Doctor of Philosophy
Master's degree
Master of Research
Master of Letters
Master of Studies (M.St.)

References

Phil